PCM or pulse-code modulation is a digital representation of an analog signal.

PCM may also refer to:

Computing 
 Performance Counter Monitor, Intel's technology for monitoring performance levels of CPUs
 Personal Computer Magazine, a Dutch computer magazine
 Phase-change memory, a type of non-volatile computer memory
 Plug-compatible machine (or plug-compatible manufacturer), a computer system (or its manufacturer) designed to be operationally compatible with a computer made by a different manufacturer 
 Process control monitoring, in computing, a procedure followed to obtain detailed information about the process use

Science and technology 
 Perchloromethyl mercaptan, a synthetic intermediate
 Phase-change material, a chemical substance with a high heat of fusion
 Phase conjugate mirror, a type of mirror, that conjugates the phase of the light while reflecting it
 Photochemical machining, a process for machining thin materials with chemicals and UV light
 Polarizable continuum model, used to model solvent in physical chemistry computation
 Powertrain control module, an on-board vehicle computer designed to minimize its emissions and increase fuel economy
 Phylogenetic comparative methods, a method for historical relationships of lineages (phylogenies) to test evolutionary hypotheses in biology, linguistics and more

Organizations 
 Paralympic Council of Malaysia, the National Paralympic Committee of Malaysia
 Partido Comunista Mexicano (Mexican Communist Party), a former communist political party in Mexico
 Partidul Civic Maghiar (Hungarian Civic Party), an ethnic Hungarian political party in Romania
 Pacific Cyber/Metrix, a defunct American computer company
 PCM, Inc., a U.S. computer retailing company
 PCM Uitgevers, a Dutch publishing company
 Private Capital Management, a Florida-based wealth-management firm co-founded by Bruce Sherman

Other 
 pcm, the ISO language code for Nigerian pidgin
 Per calendar month, an abbreviation used in legal agreements
 Per cent mille (pcm), one one-thousandth of a percent
 Pomona College Magazine, alumni magazine of Pomona College
 Pro Cycling Manager, a cycling game by Cyanide Studios
 Project cycle management, the process of planning and managing projects, programmes and organisations 
 Process Communication Model, a non-clinical personality assessment, communication and management methodology in the work of Taibi Kahler
 Psychological continuum model, a framework to classify sport and event consumers, in order of their psychological connection towards the object
 Paracoccidioidomycosis, an acute to chronic fungal infection
 r/PoliticalCompassMemes, a subreddit dedicated towards memes relating to the Political Compass test